Phalaenopsis mannii is a species of orchid found from eastern Nepal to southern Yunnan.

External links 
 
 

mannii